The Municipality of Hrastnik is a municipality in central Slovenia. The seat of the municipality is the town of Hrastnik. The area is part of the traditional Styria region. The entire municipality is now included in the Central Sava Statistical Region.

Located in the valley of a minor left bank tributary of the Sava River, the area is known for its rich deposits of coal. Coal mining began in the area in 1804. Surrounding peaks include Mount Kum (1220 m), Mount Mrzlica (1122 m), and Kopitnik Hill (910 m). The area around Kopitnik is protected as a nature reserve. Species such as the capercaillie and chamois run wild in the surrounding forests.

Settlements
In addition to the municipal seat of Hrastnik, the municipality also includes the following settlements:

 Boben
 Brdce
 Brnica
 Čeče
 Dol pri Hrastniku
 Gore
 Kal
 Kovk
 Krištandol
 Krnice
 Marno
 Plesko
 Podkraj
 Prapretno pri Hrastniku
 Šavna Peč
 Studence
 Turje
 Unično

References

External links

Municipality of Hrastnik at Geopedia
Municipality of Hrastnik website 

 
Hrastnik